The Paramount Theatre is a historic theatre in Edmonton, Alberta, Canada.

History 
The Paramount Theatre was designed by Kelvin Crawford Stanley of Stanley & Stanley Architects. Construction for the Paramount Theatre began in 1950, but due to a delay in materials delivery, the theatre did not open until 1 July 1952. The original owner of the theatre was the Famous Players Theatres.

Architecture 
In the book Capital Modern: A Guide to Edmonton Architecture, Trevor Boddy wrote that the theatre is exemplary of the International Style and "uses a bold planar surface of Tyndall stone as the main compositional element. Luxurious materials such as Italian travertine and black marble have been used to enhance the street level entrance. Large round columns express the structure. Angled walls expose these columns and along with the angled canopy, lead patrons toward the entrance."

In 2001, architect David Murray called the Paramount Theatre "one of the most sophisticated International Style modern buildings constructed in the city at the time," going on to explain that the theatre "displays many of the stylistic devices used at the time: expensive materials -- limestone, marble, and granite, asymmetrical composition, strong vertical sign element contrasted with the horizontal angled canopy, expressionistic ground floor exposed columns and zigzag entrance planning."

Current usage 
In 2014, CBC News called the Paramount Theatre "one of Canada's most endangered buildings." In 2018, the Paramount Theatre was sold to a developer.

References

External links 
 Profile on CinemaTreasures

Theatres in Edmonton
Tourist attractions in Edmonton
1952 establishments in Alberta
Theatres completed in 1952